Gordon Gcinikhaya Mpumza is a South African politician for the African National Congress. He has been a member of the National Assembly since 2019. Mpumza had previously served as the Executive Mayor and as the Municipal Manager of the Alfred Nzo District Municipality in the Eastern Cape.

Biography
Mpumza earned a Bachelor of Arts (BA) from the University of South Africa. Mpumza is a member of the African National Congress. From 1990 to 1995, he was the chairperson of an ANC branch in an Eastern Cape sub-region. He was the regional chairperson of the ANC's Wild Coast Region from 1996 to 1998. Mpumza served on the ANC's provincial executive committee (PEC) from 2000 to 2015.

Mpumza had previously served as the Executive Mayor and as the municipal manager of the Alfred Nzo District Municipality. In 2014, he stood unsuccessfully for election to the Eastern Cape Provincial Legislature as a candidate on the ANC's list. In 2019 Mpumza was elected to the National Assembly. He is a member of the Portfolio Committee on Cooperative Governance and Traditional Affairs.

References

Living people
Year of birth missing (living people)
Place of birth missing (living people)
Xhosa people
People from the Eastern Cape
Members of the National Assembly of South Africa
African National Congress politicians